"Tra La La La La" is a song written and produced by Ike Turner. It was released as a single by Ike & Tina Turner on Sue Records in 1962.

Release 
"Tra La La La La" was released as the third single from Ike and Tina's 1962 album Dynamite!. It became their fifth top 10 R&B hit in less than two years since their inception as a duo, peaking at No. 9 on the Billboard R&B singles chart and at No. 50 on the Hot 100.

The B-side, "Puppy Love," is a non-album track. It's an edited version of the song "Chances Are" from Ike and Tina's debut album The Soul of Ike & Tina.

Critical reception 

Billboard (March 17, 1962): "Ike and Tina sell this wild side with enthusiasm over uninhibited backing by group and ork. Could get exposure, especially on r&b stations."

Cash Box (March 17, 1962): Ike & Tina Turner, riding a string of r&b-pop clicks that recently include "A Fool In Love," should continue their winning ways with this one. It's a bright rock-a-cha-cha, labeled "Tra La La La La," that Tina & chorus invitingly chant against terrific Ike Turner instrumental backdrop. Backing's a ripplying rhythmic blueser tabbed "Puppy Love."

Track listing

Chart performance

References 

1962 singles
1962 songs
Ike & Tina Turner songs
Songs written by Ike Turner
Song recordings produced by Ike Turner
Sue Records singles